Allan Murray (born 20 May 1982) is a former professional Australian rules footballer who played with both Port Adelaide and St Kilda in the Australian Football League.

He was recruited as the number 35 draft pick in the 2000 AFL Draft from Lavington. He made his debut for Port Adelaide in Round 19, 2002 against Carlton. 

He was traded to St Kilda and put on their rookie list at the end of the 2002 season. He was then elevated from the rookie list later that year and made his debut for the Saints in Round 10 of the 2003 season, scoring four goals against Hawthorn.

Despite his impressive debut for the Saints, Murray's playing opportunities with the club were limited. He was delisted by St Kilda at the end of the 2006 season, after playing 15 games for the club in four seasons, and will line up for former St Kilda assistant coach Mick McGuane for the Balwyn Tigers.

Murray is the brother of former Port Adelaide player Derek and the cousin of former Essendon player Nathan Lovett-Murray.

External links

1982 births
Living people
Port Adelaide Football Club players
Port Adelaide Football Club players (all competitions)
St Kilda Football Club players
Indigenous Australian players of Australian rules football
Australian rules footballers from New South Wales
Murray Bushrangers players
Lavington Football Club players